Chahru (also Romanized as Chāhrū; also known as Chāh Rakū and Chāh Rūd) is a village in Khamir Rural District, in the Central District of Khamir County, Hormozgan Province, Iran. At the 2006 census, its population was 204, in 47 families.

References 

Populated places in Khamir County